The Escola Superior de Ciências Empresariais (ESCE) or, in English, "School of Business Sciences" is a public institution of higher education, part of the Polytechnic Institute of Setúbal. The School was established in 1994 by Decree-Law n. 304/94 of 19 December, and currently has in its training offer, courses in the field of Management: Logistics, Marketing, Accounting, Human Resources and Information Systems.

The mission of ESCE is "teaching, research and service in the field of Business Sciences, with the highest levels of ethics and quality, dignifying man, contributing, in partnership with the community, to promote the country's development in general and the region of Setúbal, in particular".

Internal organization 
Internally, the School is organized as follows:

» Management Bodies :
Director
Council of Representatives
Scientific-Technical Council
Pedagogical Council
Coordination Council
Advisory Board
» Scientific and Educational Units:
Department of Economics and Management
Department of Accounting and Finance
Department of Marketing and Logistics
Department of Organizational Behavior and Human Resource Management
Department of Information Systems

The current director of ESCE is Professor Boguslawa Sardinha.

Courses

Undergraduate 

Accounting and Finance
Human Resources Management
Marketing
Distribution Management and Logistics
Management of Information Systems

Postgraduate 
Public Accounting
Management of the Relationship and Communication with Customers
Logistics Management
Management of Training, Knowledge and Skills (in partnership with the Institute of Education, University of Lisbon)
MBA in International Business (in partnership with FEARP/USP and Sines Tecnopolo)
Master in Business Sciences
Master in Accounting and Finance
Master in Strategic Management of Human Resources
Master in Occupational Health and Safety (in partnership with EST Setúbal)
Master in Organizational IT Systems
Master in Management - Entrepreneurship and Innovation (in partnership with the University of Évora)

References

External links 
 Official page of Escola Superior de Ciências Empresariais ("School of Business Sciences")
 Statute of Escola Superior de Ciências Empresariais ("School of Business Sciences")
 Official page of Instituto Politécnico de Setúbal ("Polytechnic Institute of Setúbal")

Polytechnics in Portugal
Higher education in Portugal